Laplanche is a surname. Notable people with the surname include:

 Jean Laplanche (1924–2012), French author, theorist and psychoanalyst
 Louise LaPlanche (1919–2012), American actress
 Renaud Laplanche (born 1970), French American entrepreneur and business executive
 Rosemary LaPlanche (1923–1979), Miss America winner

See also
 LaPlanche Street, in Canada